Sasthamkotta railway station (Code:STKT) is an 'NSG 5 category' railway station in the Kollam district of Kerala. Sasthamkotta railway station falls under the Thiruvananthapuram railway division of the Southern Railway zone of Indian Railways. It is coming in between Munrothuruthu railway station and Karunagappalli railway station. The nearest important major rail head to Sasthamkotta is Kollam Junction railway station. As per the latest railway report, Sasthamkotta railway station has generated  through annual passenger tickets earning during the year 2016–17.

Sasthamkotta is connected to various cities in India like Kollam, Trivandrum, Kochi, Calicut, Palakkad, Thrissur, Bengaluru, Kanyakumari, Visakhapatnam, Mangalore, Salem and Coimbatore  through Indian Railways.

Services
Express trains having halt at the station.

Passenger trains having halt at the station

See also
 Karunagappalli railway station
 Kollam Junction railway station
 Paravur railway station
 Kayamkulam Junction railway station

References

External links

Sasthamkotta
Thiruvananthapuram railway division
Railway stations opened in 1958
1958 establishments in Kerala